A bonfire is a checkpoint in the action role-playing game series Dark Souls, existing in the form of a small campfire of bones marked by a coiled sword. In series lore, they are connected together by a magical force, and certain bonfires are tended by specially chosen maidens known as Fire Keepers. Lighting a Bonfire sets it as a respawn point for the player character, and resting at one revives most enemies that the player previously killed, save for bosses. After a certain point in Dark Souls, and for the entirety of Dark Souls II and III, they function as warp points. Similar checkpoints have been integrated into other FromSoftware titles, such as Sites of Grace in Elden Ring.

Bonfires have inspired comparable gameplay mechanics in numerous other Soulslike games. The strategic placement of Bonfires in Dark Souls, and the emotions evoked by discovering and resting at them, have been praised by critics, and they have become a popular symbol of the series amongst fans, making Easter egg appearances even in games where they cannot be used.

Characteristics 
Bonfires consist of an orange-colored flame fueled by bones of the Undead. A coiled metal sword is found thrust into the center of every Bonfire, and is required for them to work. In Dark Souls, Bonfires can be "kindled" using Humanity items to increase the amount of Estus Flasks, or healing items, for that Bonfire. Once the player retrieves the Lordvessel, they can warp between certain Bonfires. In Dark Souls II and III, Bonfires cannot be kindled, and the player can warp to and from any Bonfire.

When a player rests at a Bonfire, all enemies respawn and revert to their default locations. The player's health and magic are replenished, and all status effects are cured. In Dark Souls, the player can level up and perform other actions, such as repairing their weapon, at a Bonfire, while in the later games these can only be done at hub areas, and the player's weapons auto-repair at Bonfires. In Dark Souls II, items can be burned in the Bonfire to increase the Estus Flask's healing power, block invaders from other worlds, and increase the difficulty of areas, even reviving boss enemies the player has already defeated. In Dark Souls III, however, only the mechanic of increasing Estus's healing power was carried over.

In the games' lore, all Bonfires are linked by Fire Keepers who tend to certain bonfires. The Fire Keepers fuel the fires by holding Humanity within themselves. If the Fire Keeper of a particular bonfire is killed, the fire goes out, although it can still be warped to. In Dark Souls III, the lone Fire Keeper of Firelink Shrine cannot be killed.

Development 
Bonfires were designed by Dark Souls director Hidetaka Miyazaki, saying that they were the single addition he was most excited about in the transition from Demon's Souls to its sequel. Serving as both a recovery and respawn point, Bonfires were designed to be a "powerful" aspect of gameplay and a place where players could gather together to share experiences and emotionally communicate. It was also designed to be a "place of warmth", and one of the few "heartwarming" locations in the game's world, expressing the feeling of dark fantasy that he was trying to create.

Data mining revealed that Bonfires were once drastically different early in Dark Souls III's development, allowing players to sacrifice enemies and turn them into cult Bonfires. Another Bonfire type, created using Ceremony Swords, let the player turn their world into an eclipsed state, allowing other players to invade and conduct PvP battles. A promotional display featuring the cut system was shown at E3 2015.

Reception 
Matthew Elliott of GamesRadar+ called Bonfires a powerful symbol of relief, and "a meaty cocktail of progress, exhaustion and joy". He also stated his belief that different types of Bonfires evoke different emotions - welcoming for Bonfires at the start of areas, numb for Bonfires after bosses and great relief for Bonfires at the end of difficult levels. He said that while other games evoke similar emotions with their save points, such as Resident Evil's save rooms, no other game does so as effectively. Joe Donnelly of Vice called the introduction of the Bonfire in Dark Souls a "mark of genius". Saying that failure is redundant in games with autosave systems, he opined that Dark Souls "reinvented the save point", comparing reaching the next bonfire to receiving a badge of honor, and remarking that the Bonfire was a "central character" of the games as much as any NPC or monster.

Robert Zak of Kotaku praised the concept, saying that describing them as a "checkpoint" did not do the idea justice. Kat Bailey of VG247 called Dark Souls Bonfires a signifier of solitude, rather than companionship, like most campfires would be, but, despite that, also a symbol of warmth and safety. She remarked that other games had borrowed this imagery, singling out Shovel Knight as a particular example, despite the reluctance of Yacht Club Games to acknowledge the connection.

The lack of fast travel for a significant portion of the first Dark Souls has been particularly noted as giving the Bonfires of that game outsized significance. While Zak stated that he did not believe that the sequels to Dark Souls were ruined by convenient warping, he nevertheless said that such teleportation "undermined the unique role of the Bonfire", and "watered down their potency". Giving the particular example of the Blighttown bonfire, which is cut off from any others, he noted that it offered both solace and isolation, calling Bonfires "literal and figurative lights in the dark". He stated his opinion that, once the player lights a bonfire in Dark Souls, there is nowhere to go but forward, making it the "ultimate tension-building device". The lack of fast travel gives the player more motivation to "push on", instead of thinking of Majula and Firelink as merely "pitstops". Author M. J. Toswell described Bonfires in Dark Souls as evoking Samhain imagery, similar to the festival of Bonfire Night. Marking the veil between life and death, they give protection against invading souls of the dead, and offer the player a fraught opportunity for redemption.

Bonfire Easter eggs have appeared in Dishonored: Death of the Outsider, Borderlands 2,  Just Cause 3, Overwatch, and Battlefield 1.

Legacy 
In Elden Ring, a spiritual successor to the Dark Souls series, Sites of Grace are mechanically and thematically similar to Bonfires, and can be rested at in the same manner, functioning as checkpoints, level-up stations and fast travel points, although the player can teleport to one from anywhere on the overworld. A 1/6 scale Bonfire statue was released by Gecco Direct in 2019, featuring a removable sword with LED lights.

References 

Dark Souls
Video game objects